Kirchheim is a municipality in Hersfeld-Rotenburg district in northeastern Hesse, Germany.

Geography

Location

The community lies on the south slope of the Knüllgebirge (range) in the valley of the brook Ibra and the Aula, which empties into the Fulda near Niederaula. The local mountain is the 636 m-high Eisenberg.

Neighbouring communities
Kirchheim borders in the north on the community of Neuenstein, in the east on the town of Bad Hersfeld, in the south on the community of Niederaula, in the southwest on the community of Breitenbach am Herzberg (all in Hersfeld-Rotenburg) and in the west on the community of Oberaula (in the Schwalm-Eder-Kreis).

Constituent communities
Kirchheim’s Ortsteile, besides the main centre, also called Kirchheim, are Allendorf, Frielingen, Gersdorf, Gershausen, Goßmannsrode, Heddersdorf, Kemmerode, Reckerode, Reimboldshausen, Rotterterode and Willingshain.

Climate
On average each year, Kirchheim has 21.7 “summer days” (in which the daily high reaches  or higher) and 107.2 “frost days” (in which the temperature dips down below ). The average yearly duration of sunshine is 1,410 hours.

Source: 1200 Jahre Kirchheim, see “Further reading”

History

About 810, Kirchheim had its first documentary mention in the Breviarium Sancti Lulli (“Saint Lullus’s Summary”), a tithe directory kept by the Hersfeld Abbey, under the name Kyricheim.

Kirchheim was linked to the railway on 1 May 1906 when the Knüllwaldbahn (Bad Hersfeld–Treysa) was opened. From 1935, the community also had a link to the Autobahn network when the three-way junction of the A 7 (Flensburg–Füssen) and A 4 (Aachen–Görlitz) was built here.

In 1974, building work began on the Seepark Kirchheim between the outlying centres of Reimboldshausen and Kemmerode. The Ibra was dammed up here to form a 10 ha lake. Only a year later, district road (Kreisstraße) 34 from Willingshain by way of the Eisenberg to Raboldshausen (outlying centre of Neuenstein) was built. Once this link was in place, there followed in the same year the building of a mountain hotel, a holiday village (“Feriendorf am Eisenberg”) and a transmission tower.

On 22 August 1977, the dam at the Seepark Kirchheim burst and washed the railway tracks out near Kirchheim. This was Deutsche Bundesbahn’s reason for abandoning the line.

Amalgamations
Within the framework of municipal reform, the villages of Allendorf, Frielingen, Gershausen, Goßmannsrode, Kemmerode and Reimboldshausen merged themselves into Kirchheim with effect from 1 February 1971. With effect from 31 December 1971, Rotterterode followed. The other four villages were amalgamated by law on 1 August 1972.

Population development

*Before the Thirty Years' War 18 men, in 1673 only 8

**In 1585 there were 50 households.

***In 1637 there were 14 households.

****Before the Thirty Years' War there were 35 households. After the war, in 1650 there were 9 families and about 1745 there were 25 families. At the first census in 1830 the community had 211 inhabitants.

Politics

Community council
The municipal election held on 26 March 2006 yielded the following results:

The community’s executive (Gemeindevorstand) is made up of eight members, with five seats allotted to the SPD and three to the CDU.

Mayor
Mayor Manfred Koch (SPD) was elected on 23 May 2004 with 55.2% of the vote.

Coat of arms
The community’s arms might be described thus: Vert two bendlets argent, the chief Or sapiné.

The German blazon refers to the parting as Tannenspitzenschnitt, or “firtree top cut”. The blazon also explains that the bendlets are a stylized representation of the Autobahn.

Economy and infrastructure

Transport
The community lies right at the three-way Autobahn interchanges of Kirchheim and Hattenbach, putting the Autobahnen A 4 (Aachen–Görlitz), A 5 (Hattenbach–Basel) and A 7 (Flensburg–Füssen) right nearby. Through the community also runs Bundesstraße 454 from Kirchhain to Niederaula.

References

Further reading
 Gemeindevorstand Kirchheim (publisher): 1200 Jahre Kirchheim. Bad Hersfeld 1983

External links
 Community’s official webpage 
  

Hersfeld-Rotenburg